Bantayan Southern Institute (BSI) is a non sectarian, co-educational institution in the island of Bantayan, Cebu, Philippines. The institution is a part of the University of Southern Philippines Foundation. Bantayan Southern Institute was established in 1945. Upon the evacuation of Escolastico S. Duerte to the island group in northern Cebu, the constituents of Bantayan asked for an academic institution on the island. In July 1945, Engr and Agustin Jereza founded.

The director, principal (elementary and highschool) and dean of the College of Commerce, Education and Information Technology, is Joselyn S. J. Dulap. The dean of the Hotel and Restaurant Management program is Estrelleta Diongzon.

The Bantayan Southern Institute offers the following programs:
Elementary
Highschool
College Degrees
Bachelor in Elementary Education
Bachelor in Information Technology
Associate in Hotel and Restaurant Management
Associate in Computer Technology
Bachelor of Science in Business Administration with majors in:
Management Finance
Management Accounting

CAT program
The Citizenship Advancement (CAT) Program is a course that graduating fourth-year students must take before being eligible to graduate. Formerly, CAT was called the Philippine Military Training. The CAT course is under the Philippine Airforce command. The commands used are either in Tagalog or English. Units are as follows (from smallest to largest):
Lipaw or flight, usually commanded by a 1st lieutenant.
Pulangan or squadron, usually commanded by a captain.
Bukluran or group, usually commanded by a lieutenant colonel.
Bagwis or wing, usually commanded by a colonel, which is the highest-ranking CAT officer.

The smallest unit with an HQ staff is the Pulangan or squadron, consisting of the squadron commander (CAPT or MAJ), an executive officer (2LT) and a staff sergeant. The air group usually comprises four staff officers with ranks of major in the 1st AG and captain in the 2nd AG. The staff includes:
 G1 - Executive and Adjutant
 G2 - Intelligence and Armory
 G3 - Planning and Operations
 G4 - Supply

In the wing staff, there are usually four staff officers with the rank lieutenant colonel which includes:
 W1 - Executive and Adjutant
 W2 - Intelligence and Armory
 W3 - Planning and Operations 
 W4 - Supply

During the BSI day celebration, the CAT-officers present a ceremonial pass-and-review in honor of the BSI. This is also the day when the officers are pinned with their rank insignia. The event is attended by the parents of the officers, the faculty members of BSI and other guests.

Ranks in the BSI - CAT include:

Commissioned officers:
Koronel or colonel
Tinyente Koronel or lieutenant colonel
Magat or Major
Kapitan or captain
Unang Tinyente or first lieutenant
Pangalawang Tinyente or second lieutenant

Non-commissioned officers:
M/Sgt
T/Sgt
S/Sgt
F/Sgt
Sgt

Cadets:
Cadets for male
Cadette for female

References 

Universities and colleges in Cebu